The 1960 Bulgarian Cup Final was the 20th final of the Bulgarian Cup (in this period the tournament was named Cup of the Soviet Army), and was contested between Septemvri Sofia and Lokomotiv Plovdiv on 15 June 1960 at Vasil Levski National Stadium in Sofia. Septemvri won the final 4–3 after extra time.

Route to the Final

Match

Details

See also
1959–60 A Group

References

Bulgarian Cup finals
PFC Lokomotiv Plovdiv matches
Cup Final